Henry Williams is a former professional American football player who played defensive back for two seasons for the  Oakland Raiders, Los Angeles Rams, and San Diego Chargers

References

1956 births
People from Greensboro, Alabama
Players of American football from Alabama
American football cornerbacks
San Diego State Aztecs football players
Oakland Raiders players
Los Angeles Rams players
San Diego Chargers players
Living people